Business Intelligence 2.0 (BI 2.0) is a development of the existing business intelligence model that began in the mid-2000s, where data can be obtained from many sources. The process allows for the querying of real-time corporate data by employees, but approaches the data with a web browser based solution. This is in contrast to previous proprietary querying tools that characterizes previous BI software.

Overview
The growth in service-oriented architectures (SOA) is one of the main factors for the development of BI 2.0, which is intended to be more flexible and adaptive than normal business intelligence. Data exchange processes also differ, with XBRL (Extensible Business Reporting Language), Web Services and various Semantic Web ontologies enable using data external to an organization, such as benchmarking type information.

Business Intelligence 2.0 is believed to have been named after Web 2.0, although it takes elements from both Web 2.0 (a focus on user empowerment and community collaboration, technologies like RSS and the concept of mashups), and the Semantic Web, sometimes called “Web 3.0” (semantic integration through shared ontologies to enable easier exchange of data).

According to analytics expert Neil Raden, BI 2.0 also implies a move away from the standard data warehouse that business intelligence tools have used, which “will give way to context, contingency, and the need to relate information quickly from many sources.”

See also
 Enterprise bookmarking
 Linked data
 Object-based
 Ontology alignment
 Relationship extraction
 Semantic grid
 Semantic Web Rule Language (SWRL)
 Semantic wiki
 Social BI
 Spreadmart
 Synonym ring

People 
 Don Tapscott
 David Weinberger

References

Further reading

Interviews
 

Business intelligence
Cloud applications